Rokurō, Rokuro or Rokurou (written:  or ) is a masculine Japanese given name. Notable people with the name include:

, Japanese businessman
, Japanese film director
, Japanese voice actor
, Japanese rower
, Imperial Japanese Navy admiral

Fictional characters
, a character in the video game Tales of Berseria
Rokuroh, a character in the air combat video game The Sky Crawlers: Innocent Aces

Japanese masculine given names